The 1970 Tipperary Senior Hurling Championship was the 80th staging of the Tipperary Senior Hurling Championship since its establishment by the Tipperary County Board in 1887.

Roscrea were the defending champions.

On 4 October 1970, Roscrea won the championship after a 3-11 to 2-12 defeat of Thurles Sarsfields in the final at Thurles Sportsfield. It was their third championship title overall and their third title in succession.

Results

Semi-finals

Final

References

Tipperary
Tipperary Senior Hurling Championship